Lampropeltis triangulum triangulum, commonly known as the eastern milk snake or eastern milksnake, is a subspecies of the milk snake (Lampropeltis triangulum). The nonvenomous, colubrid snake is indigenous to eastern and central North America.

Geographic range
The eastern milk snake ranges from Maine to Ontario in the north to Alabama and North Carolina in the south. It was once thought by herpetologists to intergrade with the scarlet kingsnake (Lampropeltis elapsoides) in a portion of its southern range, but this has been disproved.

Common names
Additional common names for L. t. triangulum include the following: adder, blatschich schlange, chain snake, checkered adder, checkered snake, chequered adder, chequered snake, chicken snake, common milk snake, cow-sucker, highland adder, horn snake, house snake, king snake, leopard-spotted snake, milk sucker, pilot, red snake, sachem snake, sand-king, scarlet milk snake, spotted adder, and thunder-and-lightning snake.

Description
It has smooth and shiny scales. The dorsal color pattern consists of brownish dorsal saddles, which are edged with black. The dorsal saddles are sometimes reddish or reddish brown in southern areas of its range. The pattern on the top and sides of the snake has also been described as three (or possibly five) series of black-bordered brown (reddish brown sometimes) blotches along the length of the snake on a gray or tan ground. The blotches in the dorsal series are large, while the blotches in the two (or possibly four) lateral series are smaller. The belly pattern is black and white checks (often irregular).

In 2023, the eastern milk snake became the official snake of Illinois.

Habitat 
The eastern milk snake is a species commonly found in rural areas where hibernation and feeding sites, such as buildings and mammal burrows, are abundant, and they also use a variety of open habitats and forest edges.

As a pet
Like many species of milk snakes, the eastern milk snake is often bred in captivity for the pet trade. It is generally docile and rarely attempts to bite, though it may do so if feeling restrained.

Gallery

References

External links

Further reading
Boulenger GA (1894). Catalogue of the Snakes in the British Museum (Natural History). Volume II., Containing the Conclusion of the Colubridæ Aglyphæ. London: Trustees of the British Museum (Natural History). (Taylor and Francis, printers). xi + 382 pp. + Plates I-XX. (Coronella triangulum, pp. 200–201).
Conant R (1975). A Field Guide to Reptiles and Amphibians of Eastern and Central North America, Second Edition. The Peterson Field Guide Series. Boston: Houghton Miffflin. xviii + 429 pp. + Plates 1-48.  (hardcover),  (paperback). (Lampropeltis t. triangulum, pp. 204, 206 + Plate 30 + Map 153).
Conant, Roger; Bridges, William (1939). What Snakes Is That? A Field Guide to the Snakes of the United States East of the Rocky Mountains. (With 108 drawings by Edmond Malnate). New York and London: D. Appleton-Century. Frontispiece map + 163 pp. + Plates A-C, 1-32. (Lampropeltis t. triangulum, pp. 80–81 + Plate 13, figure 37).
Lacépède [BG] (1789). Histoire Naturelle des Quadrupèdes Ovipares et des Serpens. Tome Second [Volume 2]. Paris: Imprimerie du Roi, Hôtel de Thou. 671 pp. (Coluber triangulum, new species, table méthodique, pp. 86–87). (in French).
Lacépède [BG] (1789). Histoire Naturelle des Quadrupèdes Ovipares et des Serpens. Tome Quatrième [Volume 4]. Paris: Saugrain. 386 pp. ("Couleuvre triangle ", p. 188). (in French).
McCoy, C.J. (1980). Identification Guide to Pennsylvania Snakes. (Design and illustrations by Michael Antonoplos). Pittsburgh, Pennsylvania: Carnegie Museum of Natural History. 12 pp. (Lampropeltis triangulum, p. 8).
Morris, Percy A. (1948). Boy's Book of Snakes: How to Recognize and Understand Them. New York: Ronald Press. (A volume of the Humanizing Science Series, edited by Jaques Cattell). viii + 185 pp. (Lampropeltis doliata triangulum, pp. 24–26, 180).
Netting, M. Graham; Richmond, Neil D. (editors) (1970). Pennsylvania Reptiles and Amphibians. Third Edition, Fifth Printing. (Photographs by Hal H. Harrison). Harrisburg, Pennsylvania: Pennsylvania Fish Commission. 24 pp. (Lampropeltis doliata triangulum, p. 5).
Powell R, Conant R, Collins JT (2016). Peterson Field Guide to Reptiles and Amphibians of Eastern and Central North America, Fourth Edition. Boston and New York: Houghton Mifflin Harcourt. xiv + 494 pp., 47 plates, 207 figures. . (Lampropeltis triangulum, p. 381 + Plate 35 + Figure 159 on p. 330).
Schmidt, Karl P.; Davis, D. Dwight (1941). Field Book of Snakes of the United States and Canada. New York: G.P. Putnam's Sons. 365 pp., 34 plates, 103 figures. (Lampropeltis t. triangulum, pp. 186–188, Figure 56 + Plates 5, 20).
Smith, Hobart M.; Brodie, Edmund D., Jr. (1982). Reptiles of North America: A Guide to Field Identification. New York: Golden Press.240 pp.  (hardcover),  (paperback). (Lampropeltis t. triangulum, p. 180-181).
Stejneger L, Barbour T (1917). A Check List of North American Amphibians and Reptiles. Cambridge, Massachusetts: Harvard University Press. 125 pp. (Lampropeltis t. triangulum, pp. 89–90).

Lampropeltis
Snakes of North America
Reptiles of Canada
Reptiles of the United States
Fauna of the Eastern United States
Taxa named by Bernard Germain de Lacépède